Saramacca may refer to:

 Saramacca District, Suriname
 Saramacca River, Suriname
 Saramaka or Saramacca peoples
 Saramaccan language

Language and nationality disambiguation pages